Qusay Hashim  (born 1 July 1976) is a former Iraqi football forward who played for Iraq between 2002 and 2004. He played 16 matches and scored 3 goals.

Career statistics

International goals
Scores and results list Iraq's goal tally first.

References

Iraqi footballers
Iraq international footballers
Living people
Association football forwards
1976 births